Looking for Trouble may refer to:
 Looking for Trouble (1934 film)
 Looking for Trouble (1926 film)
 Looking for Trouble, a track by Kanye West from Friday Night Lights
 Looking for Trouble, a memoir by Virginia Cowles